John Peter Matchefts (June 18, 1931 – November 10, 2013) was an American ice hockey player and coach. Matchefts played for Team USA at the 1956 Winter Olympics.

Career

Player
An Eveleth native from birth, Matchefts played for his hometown high school ice hockey team, earning three consecutive all-tournament team honors in his time there and helping Eveleth High School win state titles in his junior and senior years. Matchefts then moved on to Michigan, signing up to play for the national powerhouse under the charge of Vic Heyliger. After sitting out his freshman season (a normal occurrence at the time) Matchefts joined the varsity team just in time for them to win the school's second national title in 1951. The following season the Wolverines became a founding member of the MCHL and responded by posting a second consecutive 22-win season and national title. Matchefts was named team captain for his senior season and while their win total dropped to 17, the Wolverines were invited back to the NCAA tournament and after a scare against Rensselaer in the semifinals, Michigan triumphed for the third straight year, making this the only three-peat in the history of the tournament. (as of 2014) With the win Matchefts joined a very exclusive club of three time NCAA champions as a player in any sport let alone men's hockey.

After graduating in 1953 Matchefts joined the US National Team for a time, playing in both the 1955 World Ice Hockey Championships and the 1956 Olympics, earning a silver medal at Cortina d'Ampezzo before retiring as a player.

Coaching
Matchefts returned to Minnesota and spent more than a decade as the coach for both his previous high school and Thief River Falls High School before being offered the opportunity to succeed Bob Johnson as head coach at Colorado College. After a decent first season Matchefts' Tigers dropped to the bottom of the conference and stayed well below .500 for the remainder of his tenure. He was out as coach after the 1970–71 season after the school denied his request for a $200 raise.

A year later, Matchefts' joined his old college coach, Vic Heyliger, at The Air Force Academy as an assistant and eventually succeeded him in 1974–75. For the next 11 seasons, Matchefts led the airmen through ups and downs as the program established itself as a Division I Independent before retiring and turning the team over to Chuck Delich in 1984–85.

On November 10, 2013 John Matchefts died in the city where he spent so much of his coaching career, Colorado Springs.

Career statistics

Head coaching record

Awards and honors

October 1991 Induction into US Hockey Hall of Fame as a player.

September 2015 inducted into University of Michigan Hall of Honor

References

External links
 

1931 births
2013 deaths
Air Force Falcons men's ice hockey coaches
American men's ice hockey centers
Colorado College Tigers men's ice hockey coaches
Ice hockey coaches from Minnesota
Ice hockey players at the 1956 Winter Olympics
Medalists at the 1956 Winter Olympics
Michigan Wolverines men's ice hockey players
Olympic silver medalists for the United States in ice hockey
People from Eveleth, Minnesota
United States Hockey Hall of Fame inductees
NCAA men's ice hockey national champions
Ice hockey players from Minnesota